XECSAC-AM is a noncommercial social radio station on 1210 AM in El Arenal, Jalisco. It is owned by José Trinidad Chavira Vargas and is known as Valles Digital Radio.

History
On September 5, 2018, the Federal Telecommunications Institute awarded the 1210 frequency, for which two parties had filed in 2017, to Chavira Vargas. The station began broadcasting at the end of 2019.

References

Radio stations in Jalisco
Radio stations established in 2019
2019 establishments in Mexico